Mission is a city in Hidalgo County, Texas, United States. Its population was 77,058 at the 2010 census and an estimated 84,331 in 2019. Mission is part of the McAllen–Edinburg–Mission and Reynosa–McAllen metropolitan areas.

Geography

Mission is in southern Hidalgo County. It is bordered to the east by McAllen, the largest city in the county, to the north by Palmhurst, to the west by Palmview, and to the south by the Mexico–United States border along the Rio Grande.

The Interstate 2/U.S. Route 83 freeway passes through Mission, south of the center of town.

Demographics

2020 census

As of the 2020 United States census, 85,778 people, 25,172 households, and 20,139 families were residing in the city.

2000 census
As of the census of 2000,  45,408 people, 13,766 households, and 11,384 families resided in the city. The population density was 1,881.9 people per square mile (726.6/km). The 17,723 housing units had an average density of 734.5 per square mile (283.6/km). The racial makeup of the city was 77.63% White, 0.37% African American, 0.38% Native American, 1.63% Asian,  18.65% from other races, and 2.34% from two or more races. Hispanics or Latinos of any race were 81.03% of the population.

Of the 13,766 households, 43.4% had children under 18 living with them, 64.8% were married couples living together, 14.5% had a female householder with no husband present, and 17.3% were not families; 15.3% of all households were made up of individuals, and 9.1% had someone living alone who was 65 or older. The average household size was 3.29, and the average family size was 3.68.

In the city, the age distribution was 32.1% under 18, 9.8% from 18 to 24, 26.8% from 25 to 44, 17.1% from 45 to 64, and 14.2% who were 65 or older. The median age was 30 years. For every 100 females, there were 91.1 males. For every 100 females 18 and over, there were 85.3 males.

The median income for a household in the city was $30,647, and the median income for a family was $33,465. Males had a median income of $25,710 versus $20,718 for females. The per capita income for the city was $12,796. About 22.6% of families and 26.8% of the population were below the poverty line, including 37.4% of those under age 18 and 15.6% of those age 65 or over.

The United States Postal Service operates in the city of Mission. Local zip codes include 78571, 78572, 78573, and 78574.

Economy
Mission shares the same economic growth that nearby McAllen is experiencing. The Mission Economic Development Corporation promotes development in the area.

The city has been advertised as the "Home of the Ruby Red Grapefruit" since 1921, due to the fruit being commonly grown in the area. The city is also home to the Texas Citrus Exchange. The city holds the annual Texas Citrus Fiesta Parade along Conway Avenue, which features fruit-decorated floats, bands, law enforcement agencies, fire departments, and many local and city government officials.

It is the location of the First Lift Station of the Mission Canal Company that once irrigated  of farmland in the Rio Grande Valley.

Education

Primary and secondary schools
Most of Mission is a part of the Mission Consolidated Independent School District. Other portions extend into the La Joya Independent School District and the Sharyland Independent School District.

Mission CISD operates Mission High School and Veterans Memorial High School. Sharyland ISD Mission is divided between Sharyland High School and Sharyland Pioneer High School. LJISD Mission is zoned to Palmview High School.

In addition, South Texas Independent School District operates magnet schools that serve the community.

Mission is also the site of San Juan Diego Academy, a Catholic high school operated by the Roman Catholic Diocese of Brownsville.

Public libraries
The Speer Memorial Library serves Mission. The facility has  of space.

The library originated in March 1914, when the Civic League of Mission was formed to maintain a park and form a library. The first library board included officers from the civic league. In 1929, the city of Mission passed an ordinance making the library a part of the city government. In 1930, the library was in a room in the First National Bank. Later, it moved to the Mission City Hall. From the early 1930s until 1947, the city library shared facilities with the school library. By 1960, it outgrew the building it had occupied. In 1976, Juanita Speer Farley donated the deed to her property to the city. A new library, designed by Warren Suter, an architect from Mission, was constructed in 1976 and 1977. The official completion date of the  library was June 1, 1977.

Media

Radio
 KCAS 91.5 FM
 KFRQ 94.5FM
 KKPS 99.5FM
 KNVO 101.1FM
 KVLY 107.9FM
 KVMV 96.9FM
 KTEX 100.3FM
 KFCC 97.9FM

Notable people 

 Fortunato Benavides, judge on the U.S. Court of Appeals for the Fifth Circuit, born in Mission
 Lloyd Bentsen, former U.S. senator and vice-presidential nominee, born in Mission in 1921
 William Jennings Bryan, presidential candidate and former Secretary of State, lived for a time in Mission
 William S. Burroughs, writer of Naked Lunch, lived in Mission for a short while and wrote about it in Junkie
 Jorge Cantu, MLB player from Sharyland High School, who played for Tampa Bay Rays, Cincinnati Reds, Florida Marlins, Texas Rangers, San Diego Padres, and now playing for Colorado Rockies
 Koy Detmer, brother of Heisman Trophy winner Ty Detmer, played for and carried the Mission Eagles football team to the semi-finals in Texas 5A football under the leadership of his father, Sonny Detmer
 Jaime Garcia, professional MLB player from Sharyland High School playing with 2011 World Series champions St. Louis Cardinals
 Kika de la Garza, former state representative and former U.S. representative, chairman of the Agriculture Committee
 Lena Guerrero, the first woman and first ethnic minority person to serve on the regulatory Texas Railroad Commission
 Pierre Yves Kéralum (1817–1872), priest and architect
 Joe M. Kilgore, former U.S. representative, reared partly in Mission
 Tom Landry, Hall of Fame coach of the Dallas Cowboys, born and raised, played for Mission High School
 Tito Santana (aka Merced Solis), former World Wrestling Federation (now WWE) star
 Trinidad Silva, actor
 Jamaar Taylor, attended Mission High School and played football, and later was drafted by the New York Giants. After his retirement, he helped coach at Mission Veterans Memorial High School for a brief period.

Sister cities
  Puerto Vallarta, Jalisco, México
  Autlán de Navarro, Jalisco, México
  Axochiapan, Morelos, México
  Ciudad Ayala, Morelos, México
  Casimiro Castillo, Jalisco, México
  Villa del Carbón, State of México, México
  Monclova, Coahuila, México
  Linares, Nuevo León, México
  Puente de Ixtla, Morelos, México:
  Ocuituco, Morelos, México:
  Valle Hermoso, Tamaulipas, México
  Salinas Victoria, Nuevo León, México
  Allende, Nuevo León, México
  Cadereyta Jiménez, Nuevo León, México
  General Terán, Nuevo León, México

See also

 National Butterfly Center
 La Lomita Chapel

References

External links 
 
 Greater Mission Chamber of Commerce

 
Cities in Texas
Cities in Hidalgo County, Texas
Populated coastal places in Texas
1908 establishments in Texas
Populated places established in 1908
Texas populated places on the Rio Grande